Vasiliki Millousi (born 4 May 1984 in Athens) is a Greek artistic gymnast. She is a ten-time World Cup Series medalist on beam and has represented Greece at the 2000, 2012, and 2016 Olympic Games. She occasionally competes in the all-around but specializes in the balance beam. More recently, she was a beam finalist at the 2011 European Artistic Gymnastics Championships. She also won the beam final at the 2012 Artistics Gymnastics Olympic Test Event which qualified her for the Olympics 2012 in London.

Senior career

2012 Summer Olympics
During the 2012 London Olympic Games, Millousi competed all-around in qualifications scoring a 12.800 on vault, 13.425 on the uneven bars, 14.366 on balance beam and a 12.933 on floor exercise for a 53.524 all-around score. She failed to qualify for any finals, however, her very respectable 14.366 on beam placed her 18th on the event and due to the two per country rule made her the 4th reserve for the beam final.

2013-2014

In 2013, Vasiliki competed at the Cottbus World Cup and won the silver medal on beam (her fourth beam medal in four consecutive Cottbus World Cups). She also competed at the Mediterranean Games in Mersin, winning a bronze medal in the team competition and a silver medal on beam giving her a total of four Mediterranean Games medals. Millousi also competed at the European Championships in Moscow where she chose to specialize on beam. She did not make the finals however, after a fall on beam meant she scored only 12.666. Millousi then went on to compete at the 2013 Antwerp World Championships. In the competition, Millousi performed well on vault and floor however, a mistake on beam and multiple errors on bars caused her to finish in 24th place with an all-around score of 49.532 (almost three points lower than her qualification score of 53.033).

In 2014, Millousi began her season competing again at the Cottbus World Cup, though failed to make any of the event finals after errors on bars and beam in qualifications. Next, Millousi went to help out the Union Haguenau team at the French Championships Team Final by competing on bars, beam and floor. After two unsuccessful competitions, Millousi competed at the Korea Cup where she rearranged her beam routine. She won the gold medal on beam with 14.325. At the 2014 Nanning World Championships, Millousi rearranged her beam routine and in qualifications, had a strong performance scoring a 53.933 all-around - just missing out on the all-around final by 0.309.

2015-2016
Millousi began the 2015 season by once again competing at the Cottbus World Cup. She did not make the beam final after only scoring a 12.466 in qualifications after an error. At the European Championships in Montpellier, Millousi made an error on the uneven bars and did not qualify to the final. After her disappointing European Championships, Millousi competed at the Baku European Games where she qualified to the all-around final. Next Millousi competed at the Hungarian Grand Prix, winning the gold medal on beam and the bronze medal on floor. Millousi ended her season with a disappointing performance at the World Championships in Glasgow performing on three events.

In 2016, Millousi first competed at the Doha World Challenge Cup where she qualified to both the beam and bar finals. Millousi was 5th in the bar final and was on track to win another World Cup medal on beam until she crashed her double pike dismount to finish in sixth place. In order to qualify for the Olympic Games, Millousi went to compete at the Olympic Test Event in Rio, performing well and scoring a 54.431, allowing her to qualify for the Olympic Games in Rio. Millousi then went on to compete at the Greek Championships winning the beam and floor titles with a 14.500 and a 13.650, respectively. At the Bern European Championships, Millousi submitted a new skill to the judges - a switch split leap in a stag ring position.

2016 Summer Olympics
She competed on the balance beam at the 2016 Summer Olympics where she wisely decided to change her double pike dismount to a gainer layout dismount. She finished in 57th place in qualifying after falling on her aerial cartwheel and did not advance to the finals.

2017
Millousi competed at the Greek Championships in March where she placed third on uneven bars and second on balance beam.  She later competed at the Baku World Cup where she won the silver medal on balance beam behind 2004 Olympic Champion Cătălina Ponor.  In April she competed at the European Championships but failed to qualify to any event finals.

2018
In June Millousi competed at the 2018 Mediterranean Games where she helped the Greek team place seventh and individually she placed fifth in the balance beam final.  In August she competed at the European Championships.  She qualified to the balance beam final and finished in eighth place.  In October Millousi competed at the World Championships.  During qualifications she placed 32nd on balance beam and did not qualify to the event finals.  She announced her retirement shortly after, officially retiring on October 30, 2018.

Personal life
Millousi has been married to fellow Greek gymnast Eleftherios Petrounias since 2019.  They have two daughters, Sofia and Eleni.

World Cup Series

Competitive history

References

External links
 
 

1984 births
Living people
Gymnasts from Athens
Greek female artistic gymnasts
Gymnasts at the 2000 Summer Olympics
Gymnasts at the 2012 Summer Olympics
Gymnasts at the 2016 Summer Olympics
Olympic gymnasts of Greece
European Games competitors for Greece
Gymnasts at the 2015 European Games
Mediterranean Games gold medalists for Greece
Mediterranean Games silver medalists for Greece
Mediterranean Games bronze medalists for Greece
Competitors at the 2009 Mediterranean Games
Competitors at the 2013 Mediterranean Games
Mediterranean Games medalists in gymnastics